William McKiddie Duncan (20 July 1913 – 1975) was a Scottish professional footballer. He played for Blackburn Rovers, Carlisle United and Gillingham between 1933 and 1938.

References

1913 births
1975 deaths
Blackburn Rovers F.C. players
Carlisle United F.C. players
Gillingham F.C. players
Scottish footballers
Footballers from Dundee
Association football inside forwards
English Football League players